|}

This is a list of electoral district results of the 1983 Western Australian election.

Results by district

Albany

Armadale

Ascot

Avon

Balcatta

Balga

Bunbury

Canning

Clontarf

Cockburn

Collie

Cottesloe

Dale

Darling Range

East Melville

Esperance-Dundas

Floreat

Fremantle

Gascoyne

Geraldton

Gosnells

Greenough

Helena

Joondalup

Kalamunda

Kalgoorlie

Karrinyup

Katanning-Roe

Kimberley

Mandurah

Maylands

Melville

Merredin

Mitchell

Moore

Morley-Swan

Mount Lawley

Mount Marshall

Mundaring

Murchison-Eyre

Murdoch

Murray-Wellington

Narrogin

Nedlands

Nollamara

Perth

Pilbara

Rockingham

Scarborough

South Perth

Stirling

Subiaco

Vasse

Victoria Park

Warren

Welshpool

Whitford

See also 

 1983 Western Australian state election
 Members of the Western Australian Legislative Assembly, 1983–1986

References 

Results of Western Australian elections
1983 elections in Australia